Tetsuzō is a masculine Japanese given name.

Possible writings
Tetsuzō can be written using different combinations of kanji characters. Some examples:

鉄三, "iron, three"
鉄蔵, "iron, store up"
鉄造, "iron, create"
哲三, "philosophy,three"
哲蔵, "philosophy, store up"
哲造, "philosophy, create"
徹三, "penetrate, three"

The name can also be written in hiragana てつぞう or katakana テツゾウ.

Notable people with the name
 (1936–2011), Japanese politician
 (1916–1955), Japanese World War II flying ace
, Japanese theatre director
 (1895–1989), Japanese philosopher

Japanese masculine given names